Helen Schulman (born April 1961) is an American novelist, short story, non-fiction, and screenwriter. Her fifth novel, This Beautiful Life, was an international bestseller, and was chosen in the 100 Notable Books of 2011 by the New York Times Book Review.

Background and career 
Helen Schulman was born in New York City, where she lives, writes, teaches. She received a BA at Cornell University and an MFA in creative writing from Columbia University. She has published six novels. Her most recent novel, Come With Me, was released on November 27, 2018. It's a book "about how technology breaks apart and then re-configures a family." The New York Times writes, "Schulman has wrapped her distress in such an attractive package that the book slides down almost without your noticing its seriousness of purpose." The NYTimes Book Review says it is "strikingly original, compelling and beautifully written." Kirkus reviews writes, the book is "Richly imagined, profound, and of the moment"  and San Francisco Chronicle calls it "mind-blowingly brilliant." Speaking with Evangeline Riddiford in an interview about her book, Schulman says, "My father, an atheist, always said both heaven and hell were right here on earth. I’ll do him one step further: sometimes both exist in your living room."

This Beautiful Life was published in 2011,  about which The New York Times wrote, “Riveting.... As much as this book fiercely inhabits our shared online reality, it operates most powerfully on a deeper level, posing an enduring question about American values.”   The novel was a New York Times Book Review Editor's Choice, and was on numerous bestseller lists, including The New York Times, L.A. Times, San Francisco Chronicle, and The Boston Globe.

A Day at the Beach, published in 2008, focuses on a family living through the September 11 attacks and the aftermath. The New Yorker wrote, “Schulman, in her fourth novel, gets both her cultural moment and the psychological particulars of a disintegrating marriage exactly right, and her writing is distractingly, almost brazenly beautiful. The result slyly demonstrates both the inadequacy of art and its insolent resilience in disaster's aftermath.”

Schulman's fiction, non-fiction, and reviews have appeared in such places as Vanity Fair, Time, Vogue, GQ, The New York Times Book Review, and The Paris Review. She co-edited with Jill Bialosky the anthology, Wanting a Child. She has written numerous screenplays, including co-writing an adaptation of her novel P.S., which was made into a film in 2004 starring Laura Linney. Schulman's essay "The Habitual Aborter" was published in Time and in the anthology, Wanting a Child. Her essay, "My Father, The Garbage Head" was published in the anthology, An Uncertain Inheritance and her essay on Faulkner's 'As I Lay Dying' was published in lithub.

Schulman has taught in graduate programs at Columbia University, New York University. She teaches at the New School University where she is the Fiction Chair at the Writing Program and a tenured Professor of Writing. She is a current Guggenheim Fellow (2019–20), she has also been a Sundance Fellow, an Aspen Words Fellow (The Aspen Institute), a NYFA Fellow, A Tennessee Williams Fellow at Columbia University and has won a Pushcart Prize.

Selected works 
 
 
 
 Uncertain Inheritance, An: Writers on Caring for Family, William Morrow, 2007,  
 
 The Revisionist, Bloomsbury USA, 2001,  
 Wanting a Child, Farrar Straus & Giroux, 1999,  
 Not a Free Show (collection of short stories) Knopf Doubleday Publishing Group, 1988,  
 Out of Time, Atheneum Press, 1991,

References

External links 
 The Perils of the Teen: Interview with Helen Schulman
 This Beautiful Book: An Interview with Novelist Helen Schulman
 Helen Schulman on This Beautiful Life
 
 
 

1961 births
20th-century American novelists
21st-century American novelists
20th-century American women writers
21st-century American women writers
Living people
American women novelists
American women short story writers
Cornell University alumni
Columbia University School of the Arts alumni
20th-century American short story writers
21st-century American short story writers